"Have You Looked into Your Heart" is a 1964 single by Jerry Vale written by Billy Barberis,  Teddy Randazzo, and Bobby Weinstein. The single went to number one on the Middle-Road Singles chart in February 1965 and number twenty-four on the Billboard Hot 100. The song was Vale's last Top 40 hit.

See also
List of number-one adult contemporary singles of 1965 (U.S.)

References

1964 singles
Jerry Vale songs
1964 songs
Columbia Records singles
Songs written by Teddy Randazzo
Songs written by Bobby Weinstein